José Carlos Gomes Moreira (born 28 September 1983 in Codó) is a Brazilian sprinter who specializes in the 100 metres. His personal best time is 10.16 seconds, achieved in June 2007 in Cochabamba.

He competed at the 2006 World Indoor Championships, the 2007 World Championships, the 2008 World Indoor Championships and the 2008 Olympic Games without reaching the final. In Beijing he competed at the 100 metres sprint and placed 3rd in his heat after Tyson Gay and Olusoji Fasuba in a time of 10.29 seconds. He qualified for the second round in which he failed to qualify for the semi finals with a time of 10.32 and only the sixth time of his heat. Together with Sandro Viana, Vicente de Lima and Bruno de Barros he also competed at the 4x100 metres relay. In their qualification heat they placed fourth behind Trinidad and Tobago, Japan and the Netherlands. Their time of 39.01 was the seventh out of sixteen participating nations in the first round and they qualified for the final. There they sprinted to a time of 38.24 seconds, the fourth time after the Jamaican, Trinidad and Japanese teams.

Moreira could retrospectively be awarded the bronze medal for the 4 × 100 metres relay at the 2008 Summer Olympics following the demotion in 2017 of the Jamaican team for Nesta Carter's failed anti-doping test.

Personal bests
100 m: 10.15 s (wind: +1.9 m/s) –  São Paulo, 2 May 2009
200 m: 21.00 s (wind: +1.7 m/s) –  São Paulo, 5 August 2006

Achievements

References

External links
 
 
 Tilastopaja biography

1983 births
Living people
Brazilian male sprinters
Athletes (track and field) at the 2008 Summer Olympics
Olympic athletes of Brazil
Athletes (track and field) at the 2015 Pan American Games
World Athletics Championships athletes for Brazil
Athletes (track and field) at the 2007 Pan American Games
Pan American Games silver medalists for Brazil
Pan American Games medalists in athletics (track and field)
Medalists at the 2007 Pan American Games
Sportspeople from Maranhão
21st-century Brazilian people